Live in Montreal EP is October Sky's fourth release, and third EP, released exclusively as a digital download on June 26, 2011.

It was recorded live at Club Soda, a music venue in Montreal, Quebec on April 30, 2011. The album's graphic design was done by October Sky, and the cover photographs were taken and stylized by photographer Eric Rouleau.

Track listing

References

External links
Official Website

2011 EPs
October Sky (band) albums
Live EPs